Sleep Chamber is an American industrial band fronted by John Zewizz. The band is known for using S&M, bondage and magic imagery on their artwork, during their performances, and within their lyrics. Formed in 1981 by high school friends Zewizz, Eugene Difrancisco, and Phil Brosseau, over the years the Sleep Chamber lineup has changed many times with Zewizz being the sole permanent member. Previous members of Sleep Chamber have included Thomas Thorn, Michael Moynihan, Jonathan Briley and Elaine Walker. Since the beginning, Zewizz has stated that the constant lineup changes are because Sleep Chamber is not a "band", but rather a "concept".

From 1982 to 1999, Sleep Chamber put out a considerable volume of music (releasing over 70 recordings, and participating in over 35 various artists releases). After an extended absence, Sleep Chamber returned in 2008 with a new lineup, a slew of new releases, and a revised name, SLEEPCHAMBER.

1981–1990 
Difrancisco and Brosseau had fronted a band called The Product; Zewizz produced their sole single. When The Product folded, Difrancisco and Brosseau began a band called Daze of Trance. Zewizz occasionally helped out with Daze of Trance, even playing on a cassette release as part of the band. Sometime between 1981 and 1982, Sleep Chamber came into existence, with Zewizz as the frontman. Their earliest works were experimental and electronic/industrial in nature. Live Sleep Chamber performances were quickly labeled as resembling a "Black Mass", with smoke (containing a special blend of incense) billowing out of machines, and the band donning black bondage masks while performing on stage. Their concerts scared some local club owners, prompting them to ban Sleep Chamber from playing. Local reviewers often accused the band of being Satanic. Zewizz, over the years, has denied this accusation. Those early concerts featured Zewizz in different combinations with Difrancisco, Brosseau, Thorn, Moynihan and also Malcom Smith (with whom Zewizz collaborated in the bands Dokument and Hidious in Strength), Darlene Victor, and Richard Gellar.

1990–2001, Sleep Chamber and The Barbichuettes 
During the 1990s, Zewizz incorporated bondage-fetish dancers called The Barbitchuettes into Sleep Chamber's live performances. With this addition, the band's popularity exploded. During live shows, the Barbitchuette dancers would perform Fetish and S&M acts on the stage as well as caress and dance with other Barbitchuettes. During the Barbitchuettes heyday with Sleep Chamber, it was not uncommon for the band to travel with up to 11 Barbitchuette dancers. Zewizz also quit driving MBTA-Train in Boston after 6 years in 1992.

1990's Sleep, or Forever Hold Your Piece started off that decade as Sleep Chamber's biggest hit yet. This new popularity also resulted in wider distribution for their music. Sleep Chamber saw their material expand from Inner-X-Musick to overseas and domestic distribution by the Italian label Musica Maxima Magnetica, the German label FünfUndVierzig, and Cleopatra Records in Los Angeles. Along with bigger sales came bigger opportunities. Sleep Chamber's local gigs required ever bigger venues. The increased popularity also allowed Sleep Chamber to do two quick tours of Texas in the late 1980s and early 1990s. These tours featured Zewizz along with Briley, Tione, Difrancisco, and Arthur PW. At the end of the Texas tour, Zewizz found himself again looking for a new collaborator with the departure of Arthur PW and Briley.

Elaine Walker entered the picture in 1991–92 to fill that void. Walker's band DDT had frequently played with Sleep Chamber at local venues around the Boston area. Walker was a Berklee College of Music graduate and impressed Zewizz with her abilities. Zewizz and Walker, together with the help of Ashley Swanson, began working on the CD Siames Succubi. Sales of this record were even better than Sleep, or Forever Hold Your Piece. A successful tour of California resulted, featuring Zewizz, Walker, Swanson and longtime friend and collaborator Difrancisco. Although pleased with the lineup, Zewizz was aware that Walker's commitment was to her other projects and that she did not plan to stay with Sleep Chamber. Additionally, by the end of the California LEATHER & LUST tour, friction arose between Zewizz and Difrancisco. Upon returning to Boston, both Arthur Woznic  and Difrancisco left the band.

Zewizz then introduced another Sleep Chamber lineup, including new drummer Jay Keegan and songwriting duo Andrew Woolf and Craig Wien, as well as help from previous guitar sideman Swanson. This lineup was the last recording version of Sleep Chamber, performing on several releases, including Some Godz Die Young and Sonorous Invokations ov Brian Jones – the latter being solely Zewizz and Woolf. However, drug addiction, personal problems, and constant touring had ceased Zewizz's steady flow of new music by the end of 1995.

Real problems began earlier in 1995, when Zewizz was questioned regarding the murder of Karina Holmer, a Swedish au pair living in Boston. Holmer's body was found in a dumpster not far from Zewizz's home. The police considered Zewizz a suspect, but no charges were ever brought. The accusation, coupled with a growing heroin addiction, quickly began to destroy the band and drove Zewizz away from bandmates and friends.

Despite those problems, Sleep Chamber took on its most ambitious project to date in 1997, a tour of Germany. Unable to get commitments from the current lineup of Sleep Chamber, Zewizz took on two new members (Scott Walker and Tyler Newman) for the German tour, as well as Barbitchuette dancer "Lulu". The latter's job during the tour included dancing during the shows as well as recruiting dancers from local strip clubs. From the USA, Woolf organized the booking of the German tour. Many stories exist of Zewizz's escalating drug addiction during the tour, and although the band were deceived by the promoters, the shows were well received and the seeds for a large European fanbase were set because of the tour. Seeing his life beginning to spiral out of control, friends of Zewizz tried to help him when he returned from the German tour, putting on a benefit concert.

Despite the problems, releases continued on Musica Maxima Magnetica and FünfUndVierzig. Between 1995 and 1997, three more Sleep Chamber albums were released. Sopor, Sacrosanct and Sirkus kept up the appearance of productivity without any new material being recorded. After the German tour, Sleep Chamber only performed two more times. The first was a 1997 benefit concert (with Zewizz, Newman, and Walker, sans Barbitchuettes), followed by a last Sleep Chamber show on December 31, 2000 (featuring Zewizz and new collaborator Bob Avakian as well as Barbitchuette dancer Semiramis). The final blow to Zewizz came in 2001 when Zewizz's girlfriend and Barbitchuette dancer Laura Graff died of an apparent drug overdose. Zewizz was questioned by police in the suspicious death before it was ruled an accidental heroin overdose.

2001–present: SLEEPCHAMBER 
Although out of the public eye, Zewizz never stopped recording. In 2004, he was able to overcome his heroin addiction and began remixing and recording Sleep Chamber material with a new enthusiasm. In 2004, he released a limited-edition CD titled Sleepsirkle. In 2007, Zewizz changed the band name to SLEEPCHAMBER and announced a new lineup featuring Gimmie Sparks and longtime collaborator Bob Avakian, featured on the 2009 release Stolen Sleep. Since 2009, SLEEPCHAMBER has released over five CDs (on Klanggalerie, Old Europa Cafe, and Zewizz's own label Inner-X-Musick), a four-LP box set with a 7-inch single and booklet titled SixSixSix (on Vinyl on Demand), and participated in several compilations.
Unpublished but recorded was a solo project in 2014 titled VAMPYRESS. John Zewizz & Bob Avakian did 6 demos with singer Madam Peacock. Due to issues between Zewizz & Peacock the project stopped. 
In 2019 John Zewizz started the so-called 'last' Sleep Chamber release. Working with Spike Devitt Eugene Difrancisco, Tick and Bob Avakian. Premiered on YouTube on Sleep Chamber facebook page were "Succubus" and "The Badge".

SLEEPCHAMBER performed its first live concert in nearly 10 years with a live-on-air show on WBRS Radio One on January 1, 2010. The resulting recording was featured on the Stratocast CD. This first live performance featured Zewizz, Avakian, and Sparks, along with percussionist Tick and backing vocalist Zora.
In 2009 Sleep Chamber released "Soundtrax" a collection of Soundtrack pieces, also from Austria Label Klang Galleries "Sorcery Spells and Serpant Charms". Panic Machine-(USA) released "Seremony" with the first 100 containing a deck of Tarot Cards.
The last 2 SleepChamber performances were at: East Boston warehouse (where Zewizz lived) 12/31/12. (24 hour bash) The last was at Crazy Castle-Allston-Mass-10/3/14

Discography 
2012
  -"2012" CDr, John Zewizz (solo) on Inner-X (XXX-Promo-07) & Old Europia Cafe Records (OECD-130).

References 

American industrial music groups